The 1953–54 Nationalliga A season was the 16th season of the Nationalliga A, the top level of ice hockey in Switzerland. Eight teams participated in the league, and EHC Arosa won the championship.

Regular season

Relegation 
 Lausanne HC - EHC St. Moritz 4:9

External links
 Championnat de Suisse 1953/54

National League (ice hockey) seasons
Swiss
1953–54 in Swiss ice hockey